Leprus is a genus of band-winged grasshoppers in the family Acrididae. There are at least three described species in Leprus.

Species
These three species belong to the genus Leprus:
 Leprus elephas (Saussure, 1861)
 Leprus intermedius Saussure, 1884 (Saussure's blue-winged grasshopper)
 Leprus wheelerii (Thomas, C., 1875) (Wheeler's blue-winged grasshopper)

References

Further reading

External links

 

Oedipodinae
Articles created by Qbugbot